Jani Gal is a 2007 Kurdish-language Kurdish  drama film directed by Jamil Rostami, who co-wrote the screenplay with Khosro Sina and also served as the producer, based on Ibrahim Ahmad's best-selling 1972 novel of the same name. The film stars Nzar Salami, Renas Wrya, and Abdul Hamajwan. The story, set in the 1940s to 1950s of Kurdistan, chronicles Jwamer after his release from prison and his search for his wife and son. It was Iraq's submission to the 80th Academy Awards for the Academy Award for Best Foreign Language Film, but was not accepted as a nominee.

Plot
The story is set in 1950s Iraq and illustrates the plight of Juamer in a flashback structure. When Juamer's wife goes into labor, he runs to get the midwife but is caught in the midst of a clash between Kurdish protestors and Iraqi police. He is mistakenly arrested, tortured and sentenced to ten years imprisonment. After his release, Juamer sets out to find his loved ones but he discovers that his wife died, without medical help, on the same day that he was arrested.

Production
the Make up artists of the film were Radmehr Aalipour and Ali Hamedi.

Accolades

See also

Cinema of Iraq
List of submissions to the 80th Academy Awards for Best Foreign Language Film

References

External links

2007 films
2007 drama films
2000s pregnancy films
Kurdish films
Films set in the 1950s
Films set in Kurdistan
Films set in Iraq
Films shot in Iraq
Kurdish-language films
Kurdish words and phrases